When Facing the Things We Turn Away From is the debut studio album from Australian singer-songwriter Luke Hemmings, lead vocalist and rhythm guitarist for Australian pop rock band 5 Seconds of Summer. The album was preceded by three singles and released on 13 August 2021.

The album was announced on 30 June 2021 alongside lead single "Starting Line". The project was co-written and produced by Sammy Witte. Hemmings described the album as "a project that grew out of a year of enforced stillness", and described it as a place of reflection on the past ten years of his life spent working and touring with 5 Seconds of Summer. The album sold nearly 6,000 copies in the United States.

Reception

Tanyel Gumushan from Clash said "When Facing the Things We Turn Away From is self-assured and confident. It is built on the foundations of classic rock songs, written on acoustic guitars and keys and follows the fool-proof formulas that has an unstoppable emotional pull... It's as though his strings have been cut and as a musician, Luke is moving freely for the first time."

Track listing

Charts

References

2021 debut albums
Luke Hemmings albums
Sony Music Australia albums